Maria Cruz or Marie Cruz may refer to:

 María Ruiz Cruz (born 1980), Spanish actress
 María Patricia Franco Cruz, Mexican politician
 María Carolina Santa Cruz, Argentine swimmer
 Sacheen Littlefeather (Marie Louise Cruz, 1946–2022), Native American activist

See also 
 Mari Cruz Díaz (born 1969), Spanish race walker
 María Cruz González (born 1971), Spanish field hockey player
 María de la Cruz (1912–1995), Chilean political activist